The Troop is a 2014 horror novel written by Canadian author Craig Davidson under the pen name Nick Cutter. The novel was released in English in hardback, e-book, and audiobook on February 25, 2014 through Gallery Books. The following year, it won the inaugural James Herbert Award for Horror Writing.

The novel follows a troop of Boy Scouts who must deal with not only the threats posed by killer tapeworms, but also the homicidal and sociopathic tendencies of one of their own.

Synopsis
The Troop follows the story of five teenage boys and their Scoutmaster as they spend a weekend away on Falstaff Island, a remote island a short distance away from the town where they all live. The troop consists of Scoutmaster Tim Riggs (a middle-aged man and the town physician), Max (a mild mannered boy and best friend of Ephraim), Ephraim (nicknamed Eef, a boy prone to violent outbursts), Newt (a quiet, "nerdy" boy who is quite intelligent), Kent (a bold and tenacious boy prone to forcing his leadership among others), and Shelley (a deeply disturbed psychopathic boy).

Determined to simulate a true-to-life remote island scenario, Tim makes sure to remove any form of communication to the mainland. However, he does bring along a radio because there had been warnings of a potential storm. On the first evening of the trip, Tim notices a boat arriving on the island. Not expecting visitors for another two days, Riggs is wary of the stranger, who, upon inspection, is inhumanly malnourished but otherwise non-threatening. The stranger tells Tim that he needs help and is ravenously hungry. After deliberating, Tim allows the man to rest on the couch inside for the night, but not before telling the boys to stay in their room.

Tim notes that the state of the stranger is almost impossible and requires heavy medical intervention to fix. Tim attempts to hail help on the radio when he is set upon by the stranger, who, in his flailing, manages to break the radio and vomit some kind of sludge onto Tim. Tim manages to push the man back onto a sofa, remarking that he felt a "squirm" from within the man's belly. The man falls unconscious from their scuffle. Tim explains to the boys everything is okay, before falling asleep watching the man.

The next day, Tim sends the boys off on a hike so that he can sort out a solution, remarking that he's starting to feel hungry. He makes his way to the beach to find that the stranger had arrived on a motorboat, but that the spark plugs needed to operate his boat were missing. On the hike, Kent forces his way into the lead and gets the troop lost. They eventually make their way to a clearing where they suddenly see a black military helicopter above them, which circles the island before returning to the mainland. When they get back to the cabin, they see their Scoutmaster, who mentions that he's lost at least 25 pounds since the previous evening. Sitting around the campfire and in a state of delirium, 

Tim asks one of the boys to assist in performing a surgery on the man, rationalizing that it's the only way to help him. He asks Max (specifically since the boy's father is the local mortician), who reluctantly agrees to assist. Tim and Max enter the cabin while the rest of the troop wait outside. Tim crudely sets up an operating station, disinfecting poor medical equipment with whiskey, before taking a swig himself. With Max's uneasy help, Tim cuts open the stranger's stomach, when a giant, white worm bursts from the open wound. The stranger's eyes shoot open and he begins flailing about until the worm wraps itself around the stranger's neck, killing him. When the worm begins on a path towards Tim, he cuts the worm in two, killing it. Both Tim and Max leave the cabin in fear. 

Outside, Tim explains to the rest of the troop what happened. Kent, intent on defying an adult's rule, goes to inspect the cabin, despite Tim's protest. All the boys, Tim included, follow him into the cabin, witnessing the mess. With unfortunate timing, Tim displays that he himself has become infected with whatever the stranger had. Kent seizes this opportunity to wrest power from the Scoutmaster and convinces the troop to help lock him in a closet. Tim pleads that he needs help, but is too weak to fight the boys off and eventually submits. Shelley then encourages Kent to have a "victory sip" of whiskey, the same bottle the Scoutmaster drank from earlier. They opt to sleep outside for the night and look for help the next day.

When the boys wake up, they notice two things. One, their cooler of food is missing and two, Kent is looking quite gaunt and skinny. The boys fight over who moved the food, eventually all conceding that an animal may have taken it. It's revealed through a flashback that Kent had stolen the food during the night and eaten the majority of it in ravenous hunger. While out looking for more food to eat, the boys realize that the storm, previously predicted to pass them, is now on a direct path heading for Falstaff Island. They rush back to the cabin and through the closet door ask Tim for help. Tim, his voice now laboured and "weird", tells the boys to get into the cellar before asking if any of them are infected. Shelley, determined to stir strife within the troop, blurts out that Kent is sick. Kent denies this. 

They make their way for the cellar and proceed downward. However, when Kent tries to walk down, Ephraim refuses him. They get into a fight, with Ephraim being the clear victor. Still, Max and Newt refuse to leave Kent alone outside. They guide him to a nearby crook in the house to rest in and be sheltered from the storm. During the night, Kent pleads to be let into the cellar as the storm has become increasingly violent. The boys relent, but tell Kent to sit in the far corner of the room. 

The next day Max, Ephraim, and Newt check on the Scoutmaster, finding that a tree has fallen on the house and crushed the closet, killing Tim in the process. The boys hear a "squirming" noise when white worms of varying sizes sprout from Tim's body, eventually emerging as a "ball" of worms. The boys flee in terror. After trying to find a missing Shelley, Max, Newt, and Eef go searching for food. In their absence, Shelley uses this time to torment and torture a now completely-disfigured Kent. Using a walkie-talkie to speak with Eef, Shelley manages to convince him that in his fight with Kent, Eef had become infected. Separated from the others, Eef begins to self-mutilate in a vain effort to remove any worms inside of him. Shelley then lures Kent into the ocean before killing him, becoming infected in the process.

When the boys return to find Shelley but no Kent, Newt and Max try to find him. In their absence, Shelley convinces a now crazed (but not infected) Ephraim that being set on fire is the only way to remove the worms inside him. Shelley obliges, dousing Ephraim in gasoline and setting him alight. The boys return to find the smoldering corpse of Ephraim and Shelley missing once more, correctly assuming that Shelley is responsible for what transpired. Newt and Max opt to escape via the same way the stranger arrived, his boat. Max guesses that in his hunger, the stranger didn't throw away the spark plugs, but ate them instead. They enter the cabin and, after a gruesome search through the stranger's corpse, find the spark plugs. They return to the boat and find that although the spark plugs fit and work, the boat requires gasoline to start. Once again they return to the cabin to retrieve gasoline, but find that the spark plugs are missing when they arrive back at the boat. After a short fight to relieve their frustration, Newt and Max search for Shelley, whom they correctly assume stole the plugs.

Following the scent of rot, the boys find a small cave they believe to contain Shelley and hopefully the spark plugs. Inside, they find the spark plugs, but are unable to retrieve them when a hideously deformed Shelley attacks and has his stomach burst open, spreading the worms everywhere, infecting Newt. Max grabs Newt and they retreat. Later, they are both sitting at the campfire once more, unsure of what to do. Max can see that Newt is becoming worse and worse, losing weight rapidly. Max returns to the cave himself and successfully retrieves the spark plugs, noting that Shelley is now virtually a corpse.

With the plugs and fuel in the boat, the boys escape the island. Shortly after, they are halted by several military ships. In a state of infected delirium, Newt stands up, saying "I'm so very, very..." before being shot and killed by military personnel. Max, the only survivor of the Falstaff incident, finds he is unable to live life normally, with everyone, even his parents, treating him differently. The ending is somewhat up to interpretation, with the final passage remarking that Max is returning to the island on a stolen boat, with a deep "hunger" inside of him.  

During the story, each chapter is intercut with various reports and interviews surrounding the events that transpired on the island. Over the course of the book, it's revealed that a scientist of incredible skill but little restraint (Dr. Edgerton) was working on a modified tapeworm that could rapidly but safely cause weight loss. He was also secretly accepting grants from military weaponry agencies to modify it for use in warfare. Dr. Edgerton convinced a man to be part of a study, becoming injected with this worm. Through careful manipulation and planning, the patient was released into Falstaff Island, to allegedly test the virulence and military capabilities of the worm.

Release 
The Troop was released in hardback through Galley Books in the United States on February 25, 2014, alongside an audiobook adaptation narrated by Corey Brill. A mass-market paperback edition by Pocket Books was released in July of that year and Gallery Books issued a larger paperback in 2016.  

It has since been released in French, Hungarian, and Chinese.

Film adaptation 
In August 2019 Deadline reported that film rights to The Troop were optioned by James Wan’s Atomic Monster Productions. E.L. Katz has been named as director, while Wan and Michael Clear will serve as producers. Noah Gardner and Aidan Fitzgerald have been picked as the film's screenwriters.

Reception
The Troop has received positive reviews from outlets such as the Quill and Quire and National Post, the latter of which included a satirical review from Davidson praising the book. The book has been favorably compared to Stephen King's Carrie for its use of "extratextual materials, including newspaper articles, interviews and the like, to supplement the narrative", which Davidson has cited as an inspiration.

Tor.com's Niall Alexander also compared the work to Carrie and criticized the characters as "broadly characterised" and stating that "This whisper is what The Troop tries and I’m afraid fails to trade in. Instead, Cutter must make do with revulsion, but it’s no substitute, ultimately. A twisted coming of age tale, more Koryta than King, which I quite liked despite its disappointing dependence on disgust." Publishers Weekly had similar criticisms, writing "Competent prose makes up in part for stock characters—the nerd, the popular kid, the quiet psychotic. Cutter’s appeal to modern-day disquiet over the ethical lapses of the military-industrial complex will strike many as pro forma rather than based in any authentic outrage over abuses real or imagined."

Awards 

 James Herbert Award for Horror Writing (2015, won)

References

External links
 

2010s horror novels
Gallery Books books
2014 Canadian novels